The 2020–21 Wisła Kraków season was the 81st season in the Ekstraklasa and the 67th season in the Polish Cup.

Season review

Sponsors

Transfers

Summer transfer window

Arrivals 
 The following players moved to Wisła.

Departures
 The following players moved from Wisła.

Winter transfer window

Arrivals 
 The following players moved to Wisła.

Departures 
 The following players moved to Wisła.

Coaching staff

Competitions

Preseason and friendlies

Ekstraklasa

League table

Results summary

Results by round

Matches

Polish Cup

Squad and statistics

Appearances, goals and discipline

Goalscorers

Assists

Disciplinary record
{|class="wikitable sortable" style="text-align: center;"
|-
!rowspan="2" style="background:#DD0000; color:white; text-align:center;"| 
!rowspan="2" style="background:#DD0000; color:white; text-align:center;"| 
!rowspan="2" style="background:#DD0000; color:white; text-align:center;"| 
!rowspan="2" style="background:#DD0000; color:white; text-align:center;"| Name
!colspan="3" style="background:#DD0000; color:white; text-align:center;"| Ekstraklasa
!colspan="3" style="background:#DD0000; color:white; text-align:center;"| Polish Cup
!colspan="3" style="background:#DD0000; color:white; text-align:center;"| Total
|rowspan="2" style="background:#DD0000; color:white; text-align:center;"| Notes
|-
!width=30 |
!width=30 |
!width=30 |
!width=30 |
!width=30 |
!width=30 |
!width=30 |
!width=30 |
!width=30 |
|-

References

Wisła Kraków seasons
Wisla Krakow